Surasu was a Malayalam–language playwright and actor from Kerala, India. He introduced to Malayali audiences a new genre of drama known as mozhiyattam which is a fusion of poetry and theatre. He won the Kerala Sahitya Akademi Award in 1977 for the play Vishwaroopam which is regarded as his best work. Surasu wrote the script for some Malayalam films such as Randu Penkuttikal. He also acted in a few films. 'Surasu' was his screen name selected by himself and literally that word means an alcoholic. Surasu was married to drama artist Ambujam Surasu, but the couple did not have children. He committed suicide at Kozhikode railway station in 1995.

Since 2004, a drama festival is organised every year in Kozhikode, Kerala in memory of Surasu. The festival was earlier known as Surasu Drama Festival but has been renamed as Kozhikodan Drama Festival since 2010.

Filmography
 Sradham (1994)
 Kakkothikkavile Appooppan Thaadikal (1988)
 Aparan (1988)
 Theertham (1987)
 Randupenkuttikal (1978)
 Panchamritham (1977)
 Srishti (1976)
 Mohiniyattam (1976)
 Aruthu (1976)
 Kamadhenu (1976)
 Ajayanum Vijayanum (1976)
 Criminals (Kayangal) (1975)
 Chattambikkalyaani (1975)...Settu
 Kalyanapanthal (1975)
 Loveletter (1975)
 Velicham Arike (1975)
 Darshnam (1973)

References

External links
Surasu at MSI

Indian male dramatists and playwrights
Indian male stage actors
Dramatists and playwrights from Kerala
Male actors from Kerala
Malayalam-language writers
Malayalam-language dramatists and playwrights
Malayalam screenwriters
Male actors in Malayalam cinema
Indian male film actors
Recipients of the Kerala Sahitya Akademi Award
Year of birth missing
Year of death missing
Place of birth missing
20th-century Indian dramatists and playwrights
20th-century Indian male actors
20th-century Indian male writers